Michelle Davidson may refer to:
 Michelle Davidson (swimmer)
 Michelle Davidson (actress)

See also
 Michelle Davison, American diver